The men's 400 metre freestyle competition at the 2010 Pan Pacific Swimming Championships took place on August 20 at the William Woollett Jr. Aquatics Center.  The last champion was Park Tae-Hwan of South Korea.

This race consisted of eight lengths of the pool, with all eight being in the freestyle stroke.

Records
Prior to this competition, the existing world and Pan Pacific records were as follows:

Results
All times are in minutes and seconds.

Heats
The first round was held on August 20, at 10:24.

B Final 
The B final was held on August 20, at 18:22.

A Final 
The A final was held on August 20, at 18:22.

References

2010 Pan Pacific Swimming Championships